Wheeleria kabuli is a moth of the family Pterophoridae that is found in Afghanistan. It was described by Ernst Arenberger in 1981.

References

Moths described in 1981
Pterophorini
Endemic fauna of Afghanistan